Dominique Aegerter (born 30 September 1990) is a Swiss professional circuit racer of solo motorcycles, competing in World superbike Championship.

For 2023, Aegerter will join the GRT Yamaha team in World Superbikes.

Career

Early career
Born in Rohrbach, Switzerland, Aegerter started his career in motocross. He then competed in the ADAC Pro Junior Cup 125cc class in 2003 and 2004. In 2005 he moved into the equivalent IDM class, where he competed until the end of 2006. Also in 2006, Aegerter was called up by Multimedia Racing to compete in the 125cc World Championship. Aegerter made his world championship debut in the Portuguese Grand Prix replacing fellow Swiss rider Vincent Braillard. He remained with the team for the rest of the season.

125cc World Championship
Aegerter continued with Multimedia Racing for the 2007 Grand Prix motorcycle racing season and still had Italian teammates Raffaele De Rosa and Simone Grotzkyj. He had a very slow start only managing to score back to back 15th place at the 2007 Catalan motorcycle Grand Prix and at the 2007 Dutch TT, and later at the wet 2007 Japanese motorcycle Grand Prix at 11th place. This championship points scoring finishes only manage he finished at 23rd place with 7 points.

For the 2008 Grand Prix motorcycle racing season, he was offered alongside Frenchman Mike Di Meglio by Ajo Motorsport to ride for them. They both accepted it, while Di Meglio has a full factory Derbi RSA 125, he uses only a standard Derbi RS 125 making him the only Derbi rider  to use a standard Derbi bike. Results improved however, as he finished 16th overall, peaking with three 8th places – ahead of di Meglio in Spain, and in San Marino and Malaysia

For 2009, Aegerter stays with the team alongside Sandro Cortese. Both riders use the factory Derbi RSA 125, giving Aegerter hope for a stronger year than 2008. Sixth place in the wet at Le Mans was the highlight of the first half of the season.

Moto2 World Championship
At the 2014 German Grand Prix, Aegerter achieved both his first Grand Prix pole position and victory in his 129th fending off Mika Kallio's advances in the closing stages.

MotoGP test

Kawasaki (2015)
In 2015, Aegerter took part in tests with Akira Kawasaki MotoGP who supplied Kawasaki engines to the Avintia Racing team in MotoGP along with the WSBK riders.

Suzuki (2022)
Aegerter made a debut-ride in September 2022 at the Misano World Circuit Marco Simoncelli, near Misano, Italy, with Team Suzuki Ecstar in a mid-season test. He rode a Suzuki GSX-RR motorcycle due to injury of the regular rider. Aegerter has previously competed for Suzuki in the Suzuka 8 Hours endurance race, when the Swiss racer was on the podium twice.

Supersport World Championship
He competed in the 2021 Supersport World Championship, winning the title with Ten Kate Racing Yamaha team.

In the 2022 Supersport World Championship, he received a one race ban for unsporting behaviour when leading the championship with nine consecutive wins. After a crash caused by another rider at the first corner of lap one at the Most round, he simulated an injury to try to force a red flag and start the race again.

Superbike World Championship

GRT Yamaha WorldSBK Team (from 2023) 
After he clinch as World Supersport world champion in 2022, he joined Yamaha for the 2023 Superbike World Championship.

Career statistics

Grand Prix motorcycle racing

By season

By class

Races by year
(key) (Races in bold indicate pole position, races in italics indicate fastest lap)

 Half points awarded as less than two thirds of the race distance (but at least three full laps) was completed.

Suzuka 8 Hours results

FIM CEV Moto2 European Championship

Races by year
(key) (Races in bold indicate pole position, races in italics indicate fastest lap)

Supersport World Championship

Races by year
(key) (Races in bold indicate pole position; races in italics indicate fastest lap)

Superbike World Championship

By season

Races by year
(key) (Races in bold indicate pole position) (Races in italics indicate fastest lap)

* Season still in progress.

References

External links

 

1990 births
Swiss motorcycle racers
125cc World Championship riders
Living people
Moto2 World Championship riders
MotoE World Cup riders
Supersport World Championship riders